Landar, Landari, or Laudari(s) was the Duke of Friuli following Wechthari in 678. He himself died before 694, when Rodoald appears as his successor.

Further reading
Paul the Deacon. Historia Langobardorum. Translated by William Dudley Foulke. University of Pennsylvania: 1907.

694 deaths
7th-century Lombard people
7th-century rulers in Europe
Year of birth missing
Dukes of Friuli